Paul Jean (born 21 May 1995) is a French male canoeist who won medals at senior level at the Wildwater Canoeing World Championships.

He  won two editions of the Wildwater Canoeing World Cup in K1.

References

External links
 

1995 births
Living people
French male canoeists
Place of birth missing (living people)